The 1995 Vale of Glamorgan Council election was held on 4 May 1995 to the new Vale of Glamorgan Council unitary authority in Vale of Glamorgan, Wales. It took place on the same day as other council elections in Wales and England. These were the first elections since the re-organization of local government in Wales.

Though the Conservative Party had led the previous council, their representation was decimated at the 1995 election, with Labour winning a majority.

The next full elections took place in 1999.

Overview
These were the first elections held following local government reorganisation, which created new 'super authorities' and would lead to the abolition of South Glamorgan County Council on 1 April 1996. Vale of Glamorgan councillors would act in a shadow capacity to the new Vale of Glamorgan Council, until the following April.

47 council seats across 22 electoral wards were up for election. The ward boundaries for the new authority were based primarily on the previous Vale of Glamorgan Borough Council, though there were some boundary changes. Ewenny transferred to the Vale, with the Llandow ward becoming Llandow/Ewenny. The St Brides Major and Wick communities, was which was previously within the Borough of Ogwr, transferred to become a new Vale ward of St Brides Major, increasing the number of Vale councillors by one.

Election result
Twenty Conservative councillors had been elected at the 1991 election. At the 1995 election their number was reduced to six, in what the South Wales Echo described as an unanticipated "annihilation" at the hands of the Labour Party. All five seats in the previously 'safe'  Conservative Alexandra ward were won by Labour, as were two of the three 'safe' Conservative seats in Cowbridge. Plaid Cymru also took seats from the Conservatives, increasing their numbers to five.

|}

Ward Results
Contests took place in every ward,(a) the first time this had happened in the Vale since 1973.

Alexandra (five seats)

Baruc (two seats)

Buttrills (two seats)

Cadoc (three seats)

Castleland (two seats)

Cornerswell (two seats)

Court (two seats)

Cowbridge (three seats)

Dinas Powys (four seats)

Dyfan (two seats)

Gibbonsdown (two seats)

Illtyd (three seats)

Llandough (one seat)

Llandow/Ewenny (one seat)

Llantwit Major (four seats)

Peterston-super-Ely (one seat)

Rhoose (two seats)

St Athan (one seat)

St Brides Major (one seat)

Stanwell (two seats)

Sully (one seat)

Wenvoe (one seat)

(a) Elections Centre source compares the percentage vote of the lead candidate for each party in the ward. It also indicates which candidates are female.

o councillor elected to the Borough Council in 1991, standing for re-election
+ councillor elected to South Glamorgan County Council in 1993

References

Vale of Glamorgan Council elections
Vale of Glamorgan